Brian Gerard Kaelin (born March 9, 1959), known as Kato Kaelin, is an American actor and radio and television personality, who was a witness in the O. J. Simpson murder case.

Early life and education
Kaelin was born on March 9, 1959, in Milwaukee, Wisconsin. Kaelin was nicknamed "Kato" as a child after the character played by Bruce Lee on the television series The Green Hornet. He graduated from Nicolet High School in Glendale, Wisconsin, in 1977. He attended, but never graduated from the University of Wisconsin–Eau Claire. He pledged the SAE Fraternity in the fall of 1980 and was accepted at the end of the term at California State University, Fullerton. During his time at Eau Claire he created his own talk show, Kato and Friends, and hosted The Gameshow on the campus television station, TV10. He eventually moved to Hollywood.

O. J. Simpson murder case 
Kaelin was a minor witness for the prosecution in the 1995 O. J. Simpson murder case. In 1994, he was staying in a guest house on Simpson's Rockingham estate and was present at the compound on the night of the two murders on June 12. He witnessed some of Simpson's movements before and after the time of the murders. His story seemed to contradict Simpson's version of the events on some key points, as he testified that he could not account for Simpson's whereabouts between 9:36 p.m. and 11:00 p.m. on the evening the murders took place, which the prosecution alleged occurred between 10:00 p.m. and 10:30 p.m. In spite of "valuable evidence" provided by Kaelin in his testimony, prosecutor Marcia Clark took the unusual step of having him declared a hostile witness, "allowing her to attack her own prosecution witness without repeated objections from Simpson's defense team." He received considerable media attention during the trial; one survey found that 74 percent of Americans could identify him, compared to 25 percent for Vice President Al Gore at that time.

Landmark libel case
After Simpson was acquitted, the cover of an issue of the tabloid newspaper National Examiner featured a photo of Kaelin without his shirt on, with the headline "Cops think Kato did it!" The article within the issue alleged that police suspected Kaelin of perjury. Kaelin sued the publisher, Globe Communications, for libel, alleging that the cover headline implied he was suspected of the murders. The federal District Court for Central California dismissed the case, saying the story was not libelous or malicious. This was reversed by the US Court of Appeals for the Ninth Circuit, which ruled:

The decision was a landmark case in libel law, finding that a headline could be considered libel. Kaelin later settled the US$15 million lawsuit with Globe Communications out of court.

Career

Before his involvement in the O. J. Simpson trial, Kaelin appeared in the beach comedy movie Beach Fever (1987), in which his character created a love potion with his friend and hit on girls at the beach; he also starred in Night Shadow (1989), a low budget horror movie.

Kaelin briefly made national headlines when he said he never told the New York Post columnist Cindy Adams that Simpson definitely killed his former wife, Nicole Brown Simpson. He said he has expressed his opinion before, that he thinks Simpson did it, but "I have no firsthand knowledge."

Soon after the trial, Kaelin appeared on the first episode of the Fox sketch comedy MADtv (October 1995) and made a cameo appearance on the HBO sketch comedy Mr. Show with Bob and David during the series' first season (November 1995); in the latter series' episode titled "We Regret to Inform You", he shows up at lobotomized actor Borden Grote's party. He appeared in the feature film The Still Life (2006) and had a minor role in National Lampoon's Dorm Daze 2 (2006). In February 2009, Kaelin guest-starred in the web series Star-ving and the movie Whacked. He was a guest on Politically Incorrect with Bill Maher, on March 29, 1995.

In 1995, from the popularity of the Howard Stern Show, the Los Angeles radio station 97.1 KSLX, which had played Classic Rock after Stern in the morning, switched to an All Talk format, and Kato Kaelin, along with standup comic Bobby Hellman, hosted an afternoon show (following Susan Olsen and Ken Ober). Kato wound up hosting without Bobby, and the gig lasted about a year. 

Kaelin has made numerous forays into reality television. In 2002, he participated in the series Celebrity Boot Camp. In 2004, he participated in the development of a reality show called House Guest, in which he would live in other celebrities' homes; that show never aired. He was seen on an episode of the E! reality series Sunset Tan, asking specifically for a "farmer's tan". He was also a guest player on the sixth episode of the Comedy Central series Reality Bites Back. In 2008, he was a contestant in the Fox Reality Channel show Gimme My Reality Show, in which minor celebrities competed to receive their own reality show.

Kaelin has also participated in game shows. He appeared on the NBC version of The Weakest Link (2002). He was a contestant on the game shows Russian Roulette as well as the reality dating show BZZZ! hosted by Annie Wood. In 2005, he appeared in the first three National Lampoon's Strip Poker pay-per-view programs (Kaelin is an avid poker player); the titles were filmed at Hedonism II, a naturist resort in Negril, Jamaica, which led him to quip, "The first few days there were the hardest!" The Playboy bunnies, WWE Divas, and pin-up models competing in the no-limit Texas hold 'em games, and upon losing all their chips and clothes, had to dive into the "Pool of Shame" and visit "Kato's Guesthouse", where he would interview the nude defeated players. He also appeared in numerous comedic skits.

Kaelin also has worked as a radio and television host. For a short time in 1995, he worked as a radio talk host on KLSX in Los Angeles, and provided online content for National Lampoon. From June 2005 to some time in 2006, Kaelin co-hosted Eye for an Eye, a daytime TV court show syndicated in 34 countries. Kaelin was a recurring guest on the video game review show X-Play.

Kaelin has also appeared in several parodies. In 2009, he was seen on the series Tosh.0, in a parody of the Keyboard Cat video titled "Keyboard Kato". And in 2010, Kaelin appeared on Real Time with Bill Maher, wearing a wig to play his younger self in a taped skit parodying 1990s television appearances by 2010 US senatorial candidate Christine O'Donnell.

Since 2011, Kaelin has hosted the TV talk show Tailgating with Kato.

In 2016, he made a brief appearance on the FX comedy series Baskets, where he performed the national anthem at a rodeo.

In 2016, Kaelin appeared in the Troma Entertainment film B.C. Butcher.

In 2019, Kaelin was a house guest in the second American season of the reality show competition Celebrity Big Brother. He was evicted by a 5-0 vote on February 4, 2019, finishing in 8th place out of 12 house guests.

Personal life
Kaelin was best friends with the actor and comedian Norm Macdonald from mid-2000 to mid-2001, according to Macdonald's The Norm Show co-star Artie Lange. He was even given a guest role on the show. He and Macdonald had a falling out that ended their friendship.

Filmography

Film

Television

Notes

References

External links

Instagram Account

1959 births
20th-century American male actors
American male film actors
American male television actors
American people of Swiss descent
Big Brother (American TV series) contestants
Living people
Male actors from Milwaukee
O. J. Simpson murder case
Radio personalities from Milwaukee
University of Wisconsin–Eau Claire alumni